is a railway station in the town of Agematsu, Nagano Prefecture, Japan, operated by Central Japan Railway Company (JR Tōkai).

Lines

Layout
The station has two opposed ground-level  side platforms connected by a level crossing. The station is unattended.

Platforms

Adjacent stations

|-
!colspan=5|

History
Kuramoto Station began as "Tachimachi Signal Stop" on 1 May 1914. It was elevated to a full passenger station on 1 September 1948.  On 1 April 1987, it became part of JR Tōkai.

Passenger statistics
In fiscal 2015, the station was used by an average of 19 passengers daily (boarding passengers only).

Surrounding area
Kiso River

See also

 List of Railway Stations in Japan

References

Railway stations in Japan opened in 1948
Railway stations in Nagano Prefecture
Stations of Central Japan Railway Company
Chūō Main Line
Agematsu, Nagano